Gundy is a locality in the Hunter Region of New South Wales, Australia.

Gundy may also refer to:
Gundy, Alberta, Canadian locality
Gundy (surname)
Gundy v. United States, a United States Supreme Court case

See also
Gundi (disambiguation)
Gund (disambiguation)
Grundy (disambiguation)